"Sleeping Dogs Lie" is an episode of the BBC sitcom, Only Fools and Horses. It was the fifth episode of series 4 and first broadcast on 21 March 1985. In the episode, Del Boy and Rodney look after Boycie and Marlene's cherished Great Dane, Duke.

Synopsis
As Albert watches a horror film and Rodney complains about the lack of jobs in London, Del Boy has found another opportunity to earn some easy money by looking after Boycie and Marlene's dog, Duke, while they are away on holiday.

The Trotter brothers arrive at Boycie's house and meet Duke, a large Great Dane who eats steak, takes vitamin pills, and injures people when playing with them.

The next day, Del and Rodney go to the park where Del reminds Rodney that it is his turn to take Duke for a run. As Del walks off to flirt with a beautiful woman walking a dachshund, Rodney is panicked to see Duke lying in the back of the van with no sign of life, and rushes to tell Del. The Trotter brothers race back to the van and are relieved to see that Duke is still breathing, so they drive him to the vet.

While waiting at the local veterinary clinic, Rodney says that he believes that Duke being ill is all because of Albert. When the vet enters having examined Duke, he tells them that Duke is still unconscious but otherwise unharmed. He asks what Duke has been eating and when Del mentions re-heated pork, the vet concludes that Duke has been struck down with salmonella poisoning. Del phones Albert and discovers that he has eaten the rest of the pork, so Del tells Albert he must go to hospital.

Later that night, back at the flat, Boycie and Marlene phone the Trotters to check on Duke, and Del pretends to be Duke by making a quick barking noise into the telephone receiver.

The next morning, the Trotter brothers arrive at the hospital to pick up Albert, who complains about how the doctors were treating him, but the doctor tells Del and Rodney that there is nothing wrong with Albert, and that Duke has made a complete recovery.

Before the Trotters can leave for the vet, a doctor then shows them a bottle of pills given to him by one of the sisters and says that patients are not allowed to bring their own medicine into the hospital. Del points out that the pills are Duke's vitamin tablets. Rodney denies it and says that he has got Duke's vitamin tablets and pulls out a bottle that looks identical to the other one. After seeing both bottles, Del realises the truth behind Duke's condition: Rodney had been feeding Duke with Albert's sleeping pills, and Albert has been on the "Bob Martins". Del and Rodney decide not to tell Albert but are overcome by the temptation to do so as they find the situation too funny. After a few jokes intended to reference the fact that he has taken a dog's vitamin tablets and with Albert confused as to why the boys are laughing, Del and Rodney ask him to come with them and Del then cheekily says "Come on boy, come on".

Episode cast

First appearances
Sue Holderness as Marlene Boyce

Episode concept
The idea for the script was purely based on a gag someone told John Sullivan.

References

External links

1985 British television episodes
Dogs in popular culture
Only Fools and Horses (series 4) episodes